You Can't Do That on Television is a Canadian sketch comedy television series that first aired locally in 1979 before airing in the United States in 1981. It featured pre-teen and teenage actors in a sketch comedy format similar to that of American sketch comedy Rowan & Martin's Laugh-In and Canadian sketch comedy Second City Television. Each episode had a specific theme normally relating to the popular culture of the time.

During its original run, the show was seen as one and the same with the cable network Nickelodeon in its early years on the air, achieved high ratings, and is most famous for introducing the network's iconic green slime. The show was also notable for launching the careers of many performers, including alternative rock musician Alanis Morissette, filmmaker Patrick Mills, and television producer and screenwriter Bill Prady.

The show was produced by and aired on Ottawa's CTV station CJOH-TV. Initially a local program, from its third season on, it was marketed specifically for a North American-wide audience. After production ended in 1990, the show continued in reruns on the Nickelodeon cable network in the United States through 1994, when it was replaced with the similar-themed domestic sketch comedy variety program All That.

The show is the subject of the 2004 feature-length documentary You Can't Do That on Film, directed by David Dillehunt, which was released in North America by Shout! Factory in 2012.

As of 2021, the second season is available to watch on Paramount+.

History

Local television 
You Can't Do That on Television premiered on February 3, 1979 on CJOH-TV in Ottawa as a locally aired and produced one-hour low-budget variety program with some segments performed live. The show consisted of comedy sketches, music videos (usually three per episode), and live phone-in contests in which the viewer could win a variety of prizes (transistor radios, record albums, model kits, etc.). The format also included performances by local disco dancers and special guests such as Ottawa-based cartoonist Jim Unger. Each week, the show took its "roving camera" to hangouts around town, recording kids' jokes or complaints about life, which would be played on the following week's broadcast. The show also benefited from several links with popular Top 40 Ottawa radio station CFGO; for example, station personality Jim Johnson emceed the disco-dance segments and shared tidbits about the artists featured in the music videos played on the show.

Veteran comedy actor Les Lye played numerous recurring characters and was initially the only adult to perform in the show's sketches; he was also the only actor to appear for the entire length of the series' run. Actress Abby Hagyard, who played "Mom" opposite Lye's role as "Dad," did not join the cast until 1982. Occasionally, the older children in the cast (such as Christine McGlade, Sarah West or Cyndi Kennedy) played adult characters.

The show was meant to offer a program for children on Saturday mornings that made no attempt to be an educational program. The idea was successful, as (according to one episode) the show scored a 32 share of the ratings for CJOH in its 10:30 a.m. Saturday time slot. The studio masters for the first-season episodes no longer exist, and all but three of the episodes from the first season were believed lost until early 2013, when copies of the missing episodes from off-air recordings were contributed by Roger Price and posted on YouTube.

The format was similar to You Must Be Joking! and You Can't Be Serious, children's sketch variety shows that Price had created and produced for Thames Television in Britain from 1974 to 1978.

National television in Canada 

After a successful first season, a national network version of You Can't Do That on Television entitled Whatever Turns You On was produced for CTV and debuted in September 1979 (its hour-long pilot episode had aired in May). The show's creators shortened it to 30 minutes, removed local content, added a laugh track and replaced music videos with live performances from popular Canadian artists including Trooper, Max Webster, Ian Thomas, Ottawa's own Cooper Brothers (one of whose members, Dick Cooper, later became a writer for YCDTOTV) and disco singer Alma Faye Brooks. Ruth Buzzi joined the cast playing many of the adult female characters, which included a strict schoolteacher named Miss Fidt and the studio secretary Miss Take. In addition, 22 children from the first season were trimmed down to seven: Christine McGlade, Lisa Ruddy, Jonothan Gebert, Kevin Somers, Kevin Schenk, Rodney Helal and Marc Baillon (another first-season cast member, Elizabeth Mitchell, only appeared in the pilot episode). The show was placed in the 7:00 p.m. timeslot on Tuesday nights, and some CTV affiliates opted not to carry the show, possibly because of concerns about its content. As a result, CTV cancelled the show in December 1979 following poor ratings after only 13 episodes.

In January 1981, production on YCDTOTV resumed, and a new set of episodes aired locally on CJOH through May 1981. The format of the 1981 episodes as aired on CJOH was similar to that of the inaugural 1979 season, but each episode featured sketches that revolved around a certain topic (something that carried over from Whatever Turns You On), and as disco's popularity had waned, the dancers were replaced by video-game competitions.

In the meantime, Price and Darby tried to syndicate YCDTOTV, and they edited each 1981 episode into a half-hour format similar to that of Whatever Turns You On. Some scenes were reshot to remove any local or specifically Canadian content, and the half-hour syndicated edits became entirely sketch comedy. The 1981 season was rerun on CJOH in early 1982 in the half-hour syndicated format. To compensate for the removal of local content, Price and Darby created a new local show for CJOH titled Something Else, which featured many of the YCDTOTV cast in a game show/variety format similar to that of The Price Is Right. The YCDTOTV team also made a pilot television film for Disney in 1981 titled Bear Rapids that was never picked up.

Four of the hour-long CJOH episodes from the 1981 season ("Strike Now", "Sexual Equality", "Crime and Vandalism", and "Peer Pressure") are available for public viewing on YouTube. The rest are only currently available in the half-hour edits.

Nickelodeon

Peak years 
In 1981, the new American youth-oriented cable network Nickelodeon took an interest in YCDTOTV. Nickelodeon originally aired several episodes in the edited half-hour syndicated format as a test run. Response was positive, and in January 1982, Nickelodeon began airing the entire edited season and YCDTOTV became the network's highest-rated show by 1983.

Production on new episodes of YCDTOTV resumed full-time in 1982 in the half-hour all-comedy format, with Nickelodeon and CJOH as production partners. Over the next few years, the series was seen on a national basis within Canada (CTV, the network CJOH-TV was affiliated with, broadcast the show on Saturday mornings between 1982 and 1990, with little publicity), but YCDTOTV continued to expand its audience in the United States on Nickelodeon, where it initially aired five times a week and eventually every day. It was not until 1988 that the series gained broader exposure in its native Canada, when it was added by the newly established youth-oriented YTV cable channel and was aired daily in peak viewing hours and heavily promoted.

Viewers in the United States were given the opportunity to enter the Slime-In, a contest hosted by Nickelodeon that flew the winner to the set of You Can't Do That on Television to be slimed (a contest later replicated by Canada's YTV as the Slime Light Sweepstakes).

In 1983 at WGBH-TV in Boston, Massachusetts, Roger Price created a version of YCDTOTV for American public television network PBS titled Don't Look Now (originally to be titled Don't Tell Your Mother!). The show was similar to those from the 1979 season of YCDTOTV, including music videos and several earlier YCDTOTV sketches and motifs (including a variation on the show's trademark green slime gag called "Yellow Yuck"). Despite high ratings, the series ended after its five-episode trial run in October 1983, possibly because of complaints from parents for its content and also Nickelodeon's concern that if Don't Look Now were to be successful, it could mean the end of YCDTOTV. The series was believed lost until all five episodes surfaced in early 2013; these have been posted on YouTube, excluding the copyrighted music videos.

Price created another show for Nickelodeon, the less successful Turkey Television in 1985, which featured several main cast members of YCDTOTV, including Les Lye, Christine McGlade, Kevin Kubusheskie and Adam Reid. By this time, McGlade, now well into her twenties and eager to move on with her life, had moved to Toronto and was flying back to Ottawa for YCDTOTV taping sessions. Turkey Television also marked McGlade's debut as a producer, a career that she continued after leaving YCDTOTV in 1986. Another Price production using YCDTOTV cast members, UFO Kidnapped, was made in 1983. Although the pilot aired on Nickelodeon, the series was not picked up.

Changing of the guard and controversies 
By 1987, many of the "veteran" cast members such as Matt Godfrey, Doug Ptolemy, Vanessa Lindores and Adam Reid had grown too old for the show. Longtime host Christine McGlade ("Moose") had departed the previous year, as had Alasdair Gillis (who had been promoted to cohost with McGlade in 1985 before leaving toward the end of the 1986 season). Lisa Ruddy ("Motormouth"), McGlade's longtime sidekick on the show, left at the end of the 1985 season. Only five episodes were filmed for the 1987 season, the shortest season of You Can't Do That on Televisions 15-year span on the air (tied with 1990, which also lasted only five episodes), and one of the episodes, "Adoption," proved so controversial that it was banned after being shown twice (a "DO NOT AIR" sticker was reportedly placed on the master tape at CJOH). "Adoption" is the only episode that was banned in the United States. In Canada, the "Divorce" episode was banned, but the "Adoption" episode was shown with one part cut; in the sketch in which Senator Prevert calls the adoption agency to send his son back after using him to do chores all day, the line in which he calls the adoption agency officer a "damn bureaucrat" was excised.

In addition, Nickelodeon had removed the half-hour edits of the 1981 episodes of You Can't Do That on Television from its daily rotation, along with the 1982 "Cosmetics" episode. The 1981 episodes were supposed to air for the last time during a 1985 week-long promotion called "Oldies but Moldies," with contests in which viewers could win prizes such as "tasty, fresh chocolate syrup"; instead, the episodes continued to air until the end of 1987, but not very often. Reportedly, this was because Nickelodeon's six-year contract to air the 1981 season expired in 1987, and as Nickelodeon was beginning to aim for a younger demographic and many of the 1981 episodes dealt with topics more relevant to adolescents (such as smoking, drugs, sexual equality and peer pressure), the network opted not to renew the contract. Nickelodeon allegedly removed the "Cosmetics" episode from rotation for the latter reason (although the "Addictions" episode from that same season was not dropped). By contrast, when Canada's YTV began airing the series in 1989, they continued airing the 1981 season as part of the package, as well as Whatever Turns You On, which was never shown in the United States.

Final years 
Roger Price moved to France following production of the 1987 season after being informed that Nickelodeon was not planning to order more episodes, and production was suspended for 1988. When Price eventually returned to Canada, he wanted to resume production of You Can't Do That on Television from Toronto, but was convinced by the cast and crew to return to Ottawa and CJOH. Nickelodeon ordered more YCDTOTV episodes for the 1989 season. Auditions were held at CJOH in the spring of 1988, and taping began that fall. The only child cast members to make the transition from 1987 to 1989 were Amyas Godfrey and Andrea Byrne, although a few minor cast members seen in 1986, including Rekha Shah and James Tung, returned for some episodes.

Opinions regarding the 1989 and 1990 episodes of YCDTOTV are mixed among longtime fans of the show, particularly in reference to the new episodes' increasing reliance on bathroom humor and more slime and water gags (which was supposedly at the request of Nickelodeon executives). In any case, the show did not completely sever ties to its past, as many former cast members reappeared during the 1989 season in cameo roles, most notably in the "Age" episode, which was hosted by Vanessa Lindores (who was slimed twice during it) and also featured cameos by Doug Ptolemy, Alasdair Gillis, Christine McGlade and Kevin Kubusheskie (who by that time had become a stage producer on the show). Gillis also appeared briefly in the "locker jokes" segment during the "Fantasies" episode, and Adam Reid, who by this time had become an official writer for YCDTOTV, also appeared (and was slimed) at the very end of the episode "Punishment."

The show's ratings declined throughout 1989 and 1990. The network's desire to produce more of its own shows at its new studios at Universal Studios in Orlando, Florida, coupled with low ratings, caused production of You Can't Do That on Television to officially end in 1990 after only five episodes (tying 1990 with 1987 as the shortest season of the series). Though ratings declined, Nickelodeon continued to air reruns until January 1994, at which point it was only aired on weekends.

On October 5, 2015, Nickelodeon's sister network TeenNick brought the show back in reruns as the first program on The Splat, its expanded classic-themed block. The airings began with the first two 1981 episodes, "Work" and "Transportation," marking the first time that those episodes had aired on American television in 30 years. However, only two additional episodes ("Christmas" and "Holidays" from the 1984 season) have been aired since. As of March 23, 2021, the 1981 season has been made available to stream on Paramount+.

International airings
YCDTOTV was aired in Australia with great success on ABC Television in the mid-1980s, beginning with 1981's "Work, Work, Work." It aired at 5:30 p.m. on weekdays until August 1987 when the initial run ended. After its first two runs, it was moved to a 7:00 a.m. weekday morning timeslot in 1989. It continued to run periodically on ABC Television for the next few years, mainly as a filler during the school holidays until the rights expired in the early 1990s. The show was aired in its entirety, including the final seasons of 1989–90. As in the United States, the series was rerun into the early 1990s.

The series was also seen in some European countries and reportedly in the Middle East (with Arabic dubbing), although no French-dubbed version for distribution in either France or francophone Canada is known to exist, nor were any local adaptations based on the YCDTOTV format known to have been made.

YCDTOTV was also broadcast in several other countries, such as the United Kingdom (on the former satellite and cable children's network The Children's Channel), New Zealand (on TV3), Germany (on Armed Forces Network with the original English audio), Saudi Arabia (on the country's former English-language channel Saudi 2) and the Philippines (on RPN-9).

Parody 
YCDTOTV has been occasionally referenced during episodes of Robot Chicken, including some of the show's trademark gags, such as locker jokes, Barth's Burgery and green slime.

In the Family Guy episode "Fast Times at Buddy Cianci Jr. High", Peter Griffin is slimed after saying "I don't know'" followed immediately by a still shot that is a direct reference to YCDTOTV'''s opening sequence, with the words "You Can't Do That on Television" written in red over a man's face. A later episode of the series was titled "You Can't Do That on Television, Peter", but contained no overt references to YCDTOTV.

In the NewsRadio episode "The Song Remains the Same", Mr. James celebrates April Fools' Day (in February) by having Joe install the "trigger machines" from YCDTOTV, and then tricks the cast into getting slimed and doused with water.

The "1981" episode of VH1's I Love the '80s 3-D features a segment on YCDTOTV that features Hal Sparks, Alyson Hannigan and "Weird Al" Yankovic all getting slimed after being tricked into saying "I don't know." Wil Wheaton is also slimed during the opening credits.YCDTOTV is also loosely parodied in the 2010 How I Met Your Mother episode "Glitter", with Cobie Smulders' character on the Canadian television show "Space Teens" making several references to the show. In reality, Smulders grew up a fan of the show.

The Saturday Night Live season 47 episode hosted by John Mulaney features a humorous account of how green slime came to be introduced to YCDTOTV and ultimately Nickelodeon.

 Reunion 
In July 2004, to celebrate the program's 25th anniversary, a reunion special called Project 131 with the theme Changes was produced at CJOH-TV starring five members of the original cast. These included Brodie Osome, Marjorie Silcoff, and Vanessa Lindores (visibly pregnant at the time), Justin Cammy and Alasdair Gillis. It was directed by David Dillehunt.

 Proposed reboot 
In August 2017, it was announced that You Can't Do That on Television would be getting a reboot. Original creator Roger Price would serve as executive producer, while Jimmy Fox of Main Event Media would develop the project. However, Fox stated on their Twitter account on September 14, 2019 that the reboot had been called off.

 Trademarks 

The theme of the show's comedy centered around how kids are treated by adults and the rest of the world.  The show's skits gave satirical and exagerrated views of grown-ups as clueless, out of touch, and often using their status as adults to take advantage of kids.  Les Lye portrayed several characters in the recurring skits, including "Ross", the technical producer and director of the show who constantly cheated and swindled money from everyone, especially the kid actors; "Barth", a cook at the fast-food burger place who cooked terrible food for the kids; the unnamed "Dad" who tried to raise his kids but was utterly clueless about what his kids were doing; and other characters.  The younger characters, meanwhile, differed from other kids' TV shows in the way they often bickered and insulted one another (in their character roles), rather than getting along and enjoying their time together as seen on most other shows for children.  Hosts Christine and Alanis frequently insulted each other and each tried to outdo the other in their roles, reflecting the real-life rivalries and competition taking place among kids in everyday life.

Episodes of YCDTOTV included recurring gimmicks and gags. The following is a partial list.

 Opening animation: the Children's Television Sausage Factory 
Originally created by Rand MacIvor (under art director John C. Galt), who was inspired by Terry Gilliam's "gilliamations," the opening animation sequence was a sequence of surreal images set to Rossini's "William Tell Overture" performed in a Dixieland jazz arrangement by the National Press Club and Allied Workers Jazz Band. Though the arrangement of the theme music stayed the same throughout the entire series run (although there are subtle differences between the themes in various seasons – especially the closing themes – and Whatever Turns You On used a completely different theme song), the opening animation itself changed in different ways.
 The Centre Block of the Canadian Parliament complex was used in the first season and in the original hour-long versions of the 1981 season episodes. In this animation sequence, a person pulls the roof off one side of the building, releasing three balloons bearing the likenesses of the three party leaders at the time: Pierre Trudeau (Liberal), Joe Clark (Progressive Conservative) and Ed Broadbent (NDP). A hand from off-screen then ignites the bottom of the Peace Tower with a match and it launches like a rocket. The start of the animation features a likeness of 1979 cast member David Helpin.
 There are two versions of the "Children's Television Sausage Factory" animation. In this sequence, children are "processed" in the "sausage factory" and deposited onto a school bus at the bottom of the factory that transports them to the TV studio (a likeness of the CJOH studios on Merivale Road in Nepean, Ontario). The first version was created for the half-hour, internationally syndicated versions of the 1981 episodes. The second version, which featured larger images and cleaner (albeit less fluid) scene animation than the first version, was introduced in the 1982 season and was used for both the U.S. and Canadian broadcasts of You Can't Do That on Television until the end of the show in 1990.
 Both versions of the "Children's Television Sausage Factory" animation feature likenesses of Jonothan Gebert, Kevin Somers, Marc Baillon and Christine McGlade exiting the school bus, as well as a likeness of Les Lye as the security guard at the door of the TV studio. This footage was reused from the opening sequence of 1979's short-lived Whatever Turns You On.
 The ending of the introduction shows Lye's face with his mouth opening, and his face is stamped "You Can't Do That on Television." The screen is then cracked and splits, and the show begins.

 Preempted show Intro 
Starting in season two, before the intro, there was usually a title card with a gag show that was "preempted" with the announcer Les Lye introducing it (ex: "Mr. T Thinks He's A Girl will not be seen today, so that we may present a show still trying to find itself."—Episode: "Identity Crisis"). A lot of 1980s cultural references were used at the time (The A-Team, General Hospital, Rambo, Mister Rogers Neighborhood etc). Sometimes, the show itself was preempted (which happened three times). On the episode "Failure", they failed to come up with an intro.

 Opposites 
Each episode had an "opposites" segment ("Opposite Skits, where the opposite of real life really happens"), introduced by a visual effect of the screen flipping upside down, shifting left to fade to the next sketch, and then righting itself. Typically, right before this happened, one or more cast members would be interrupted by another cast member saying the opposite of what the monologue (or dialogue) was about, at which the cast would say, "It must be the introduction to the opposites", and then the inversion fade would happen. The sketches that followed were a tongue-in-cheek reversal of the show's subject and of daily life, often featuring children having authority over adults or adults encouraging children to behave badly (for example, eating sweets instead of vegetables or wasting money on something frivolous rather than putting the money in the bank).

Some "opposites" features were reversals of the roles and gags related to the show's recurring characters (usually played by Les Lye or Abby Hagyard), such as the cast getting to execute El Captaino at the firing squad or torturing Nasti the dungeon keeper. Inverse tropes related to Mr. Schitdler in the classroom and the principal in detention were also frequent; however, very rarely would an opposite feature the kids getting their revenge on Barth.

A return to the show's daily subject was indicated by another inversion fade, sometimes accompanied by one of the cast members saying, "back to reality." These would occasionally occur in the middle of a sketch, resulting in the characters inverting whatever they were doing prior to the conclusion of the sketch.

Opposite sketches were used in the inaugural season of the show (the first one, in Episode 2, was submitted by a viewer), but it was not until Whatever Turns You On that they became an integral part of the show.

 Firing squad 
Most episodes, starting in 1981, included one or more firing-squad sketches in which Lye played El Capitano, a Latin American military officer preparing to order a firing squad (whom he addressed as "the amigos") to execute one of the child actors tied up standing in front of a firing post. The kid would often trick El Capitano into being shot by the firing squad himself, and, as he keeled over, El Capitano would groan "That is one sneaky keed."

Barth's Burgers
Starting with the 1981 season, most episodes featured sketches with the kids eating at Barth's Burgery, a fast-food burger restaurant run by Barth (Lye), a chain-smoking, unpleasant, disgusting cook who uses unsanitary and questionable methods of cooking burgers. Most of the sketches involve Barth revealing the contents of the burgers to the kids' disgust.

In the 1981 and 1982 seasons, Barth had a worker, Zilch (played by Darryll Lucas), whom he frequently insulted and abused, often by hitting him with a pan and knocking him out cold.

 Locker jokes 
During the "locker jokes" segment of each episode, cast members, standing inside school lockers with the words "You Can't Do That on Television" painted on them, told jokes to each other. The person telling the joke would open his or her locker and call another cast member, to whom he or she would tell the joke. For the duration of the joke, those cast members would be the only ones seen with open lockers. After each joke, the actors would close their lockers, allowing the process to start again with different people and a new joke. This was similar to the "joke wall" segment on Rowan and Martin's Laugh-In. The "locker jokes" feature was introduced in the first season and continued until the end of the series. The lockers underwent a few minor makeovers during the show's early years, but mostly remained the same for the entire run of the show. In 2004, when fans and cast reunited for the show's 25th anniversary, the original lockers were auctioned.

 Production bumper 
Used in a few episodes in the first two seasons and by almost every episode in later seasons, the closing credits of You Can't Do That on Television are followed by an announcement of the "company" that produced the program, with the name generally tying in with the episode's main subject. These announcements are given in the form of "'You Can't Do That on Television' is a __ production." Examples of the fictional production company include "Black Eye" ("Bullying"), "Can't Give It Away" ("Marketing"), "Split Down the Middle" ("Divorce"), "Hang Out to Dry" ("Malls") and "Blood Is Thicker Than Water" ("Families"). The production company's name was announced by Lye, who often included a joke about the show or its producers only to realize that the cameras were still rolling.

 Post-credit scene 
The post-credit production bumper was generally followed by one final sketch, also borrowing a concept from Laugh-In, in which the jokes continued for a time after the credits finished rolling. The bumper frequently took place "backstage" and broke the fourth wall with remarks about the episode, usually featuring one final humiliation or comeuppance for that episode's main cast member. These scenes were often cut short or removed altogether, especially for airings on Nickelodeon.

 Other 
Other signature recurring bits on the show include:
 Fake commercials: Parodies of television commercials were part of the series as early as the first season and were the subject of one full episode in 1986, but the 1982 episodes contained commercial parodies that aired between the commercial bumpers where real commercials ordinarily fit. The products featured ranged from parodies of actual products (such as the Lotachi Lugman, a parody of the Sony Walkman) to completely fictional products (such as a fragrance called "Crème de Peanut"). These fake commercials were cut when Nickelodeon became advertiser-supported in 1983, although some were preserved for later Worst of YCDTOTV compilations.
 Blip's Arcade: Blip, owner of the local video arcade, would find inventive and devious ways to cheat his customers, such as rigging unwinnable video games or running "specials" in which, he would exchange only three quarters for a dollar.
 Nasti's Dungeon: A kid shackled in a dungeon for unknown reasons would be approached by prison warden Nasti, who would make the prisoner falsely believe that he was to be set free. Rarely, a prisoner could convince Nasti to free him or trick Nasti into exchanging places.
 Benedict Arnold School: Strict Mr. Schidtler wages an eternal war with his unruly, ill-prepared students. The school sketches include those in which Mr. Schidtler prevails by embarrassing or punishing students and those in which the students trick him into looking foolish or dismissing class early.
 Various interiors of the Prevert home, including the front steps as Mom prepares to send the kids off to school.
 A bunk bed at summer camp where the kids discuss how uncomfortable and sadistic the camp activities are.
 A doctor's office, dentist office and principal's office, all similarly evil or mischievous.

 Water, slime and pies 
Affectionately called "stage pollution" by the cast and crew, certain keywords resulted in cast members having unpleasant substances poured onto them from above, or thrown at them from off camera.

 Water 
When someone said the word "water", "wash" or "wet", a large amount of cold water would fall onto them from above. In the earlier years of the show, cast members (especially Christine) were doused pails of water, but starting in 1981, the water would fall from above. By the 1984 season, only the word "water" led to a dousing, whereas in earlier seasons, the words "wet" and "H2O" also did. On occasion, cast members tried to dodge the water by saying "agua" (Spanish), "Wasser" (German) or "eau" (French) instead, only to be soaked anyway.

While the show's green slime changed ingredients and even consistencies frequently, the water was almost always the same. Occasionally, cast members were doused with variations, such as soapy, hot, brown, toilet or yellow polluted water.

 Slime 
When someone said, "I don't know," green slime would pour down on them from above. This type of prank was known as being "slimed," and it became one of the show's most notable elements. As with waterings, the sliming gag was used in almost every episode, especially from 1982 onward.

Green slime was a fixture of the series from the very beginning, appearing in the show's first episode. According to Geoffrey Darby in the book Slimed! An Oral History of Nickelodeon's Golden Age, the original slime developed "by accident"; Darby had originally planned for a bucket of food leftovers from the CJOH cafeteria, with water added, to be dumped on Tim, but the production of that first episode was delayed by a week, and when the time came to shoot the scene, the contents of the bucket had turned green with mold. Darby authorized the mixture to be dumped on Tim anyway. Roger Price was furious, but the response from the viewing audience was positive, so Darby and Price wrote an entire 1979 show about the slime ("The Green Slime Show") in which Lisa Ruddy is the victim of six slimings (a YCDTOTV record). With that episode, the use of "I don't know" as the slime's trigger phrase was introduced, and it quickly became the show's trademark gag.

Most of the cast did not like getting slimed (Christine McGlade said it was "gross and challenging"), and on occasion, they tried to avoid saying "I don't know." This usually backfired, as in the "Computers" episode when McGlade said "insufficient data" instead of "I don't know" and got green slime dumped on her anyway. Some variations of the magic words also triggered the slime, such as in the "Blame" episode when the entire cast got slimed together after one of them said, "we don't know."

Although the slime was usually green, other colors, such as red, blue, yellow and even black and white, were occasionally used. 1981's "Safety First" episode, which featured white slime as part of a recurring joke in about "wearing white at night," was the first episode known to have used a slime color other than green. Lisa got slimed with white slime after saying "I really don't know". In the 1982 episode "Television," Christine is slimed in green, red, blue, yellow and "stripes" (green, red, blue and yellow at once) while trying to explain about green slime to newcomer Vanessa Lindores. This sketch was later seen in the opening to the 1987 thriller film Fatal Attraction. In one of the show's crueler pranks, Ross (Les Lye) tricks Christine into getting dumped with a thicker, chunkier blue slime. The 1986 "Enemies and Paranoia" episode used the word "freedom" as a trigger phrase for red slime after the studio was taken over by Russian communists. Other instances of slime colors other than green include orange slime in the "Myths" episode, brown slime in the "Cosmetics" episode and black slime in the "Time" episode.

The recipe for green slime originally consisted of rotten food. However, after continued complaints from the cast about the hazardous ingredients, the recipe was changed to a mixture of lime-green gelatin powder, oatmeal and water. Eventually baby shampoo was added so that it the slime would wash out of the actors' hair more easily after several of the female cast members complained. In the "Television" episode, Christine reveals the ingredients as water, gelatin powder, flour and soap. In later years, the recipe consisted simply of green food coloring and cottage cheese, though it spoiled if left too long under hot studio lights.

Especially in the later years of the show, cast members who were slimed frequently looked upward into the slime as it was falling so that it covered their faces (the same was also true of the waterings). To avoid damage to the set from water or slime, a clear tarpaulin was laid on the floor, which can occasionally be seen and/or heard underneath the actors, and the loud splatter sound usually heard during a watering or sliming is that of the liquid hitting the tarpaulin. Actors to be slimed or soaked usually appeared barefoot in the scene, and several cast members who were slimed were reportedly paid extra. Scenes involving slimings were the final ones taped during a recording, allowing the actors to immediately rinse after the scene without causing delays.

Green slime grew to become a trademark image for Nickelodeon, and the network demanded more slimings on the show as the years went on, resulting in episodes such as 1985's "Movies" in which the entire cast (save for Abby Hagyard) is slimed. Nickelodeon later introduced green slime shampoo, which was a frequent parting gift on its game show Double Dare, on which slime was heavily used. Mattel sold Nickelodeon slime and the Gak brand in the 1990s. Slime was also frequently used in the network's advertisements featuring YCDTOTV cast members as victims of an impromptu sliming. Nickelodeon's former studios in Orlando had a green slime geyser. The network continues to use green slime during its annual Kids' Choice Awards and incorporated it into a live National Football League broadcast on the network in CGI form.

 Pies 
The original slapstick pie-in-the-face gag was also frequently used on YCDTOTV, although pie scenes were most common during the early years of the show. One whole episode, 1981's Drugs, was constructed completely around the pie-in-the-face gag; to avoid the wrath of the censors, the episode showed the cast getting "high" by pieing themselves continuously, comparing the stupidity of hitting oneself with a pie to that of taking drugs. Unlike the slime and water, pies were not usually triggered by any certain word or trigger phrase, although in the earlier years, saying "let me have it" or "give it to me" would frequently result in a pieing.

 Cast 

Apart from the central cast as Les Lye and Abby Hagyard, who played the adult character roles, over 100 pre-teen and teenage actors appeared on YCDTOTV'' between 1979 and 1990. Some of the most notable cast members included:

References

Further reading 
  
 Hagyard, Abby (Winter 2016). "FAME: The Collectors' Edition". Features behind-the-scenes photos and interviews with the cast of "You Can't Do That on Television".  

 Abby Hagyard Publishing - Site for star of "You Can't Do That on Television"
 

1970s Canadian children's television series
1970s Canadian sketch comedy television series
1970s Canadian variety television series
1979 Canadian television series debuts
1979 Canadian television series endings
1980s Canadian children's television series
1980s Canadian sketch comedy television series
1980s Canadian variety television series
1980s Nickelodeon original programming
1987 Canadian television series endings
1990s Canadian children's television series
1990s Canadian sketch comedy television series
1990 Canadian television series endings
1990s Canadian variety television series
Canadian children's comedy television series
Canadian television series revived after cancellation
Children's sketch comedy
Comedy franchises
CTV Television Network original programming
English-language television shows
Television series about television
Television series by Bell Media
Television series featuring gunge
Television shows filmed in Ottawa